The simple station Marsella is part of the TransMilenio mass-transit system of Bogotá, Colombia, which opened in the year 2000.

Location 
The station is located in the industrial sector of the city, specifically on Avenida de Las Américas with Carrera 69. It serves the Marsella, Nueva Marsella, Ferrol, and Lusitania nei

History 
In 2003, service on the Avenida de Las Américas line was extended from Distrito Grafiti to Transversal 86, including this station.

The station is named Marsella after the neighborhood that surrounds it.

Station services

Old trunk services

Main line service

Feeder routes 
This station does not have connections to feeder routes.

Inter-city service 
This station does not have inter-city service.

External links 
 TransMilenio

See also 
 Bogotá
 TransMilenio
 List of TransMilenio Stations

TransMilenio